Nishikawa v. Dulles, 356 U.S. 129 (1958), is a United States Supreme Court case in which the Court ruled that a dual US/Japanese citizen who had served in the Japanese military during World War II could not be denaturalized unless the United States could prove that he had acted voluntarily.

Mitsugi Nishikawa, born in California to Japanese parents, went to Japan to study, and he was conscripted into the Japanese military in early 1941. After the end of the war, Nishikawa was informed by US officials that he had lost his citizenship because he had served in a foreign army. His case was eventually reviewed by the Supreme Court, which decided that the burden of proof must be on the government to prove that Nishikawa's Japanese military service was undertaken voluntarily before he could be stripped of his citizenship.

Background 
Mitsugi Nishikawa was born in Artesia, California in 1916, making him a US citizen by birth. Because his parents were Japanese citizens, he also had Japanese citizenship. He resided in the United States until August 1939, before the outbreak of World War II, when he went to Japan to study. On March 1, 1941, he was conscripted into the Japanese Army, nine months before the attack on Pearl Harbor, and he served as a mechanic. Japanese law provided a maximum sentence of three years for evading conscription. After the war, he applied to the US consulate in Japan for a US passport. Instead he was deprived of his US citizenship under section 401(c) of the Nationality Act 1940, which reads:

He petitioned a US district court for a declaration that he was still an American citizen because he had not enlisted voluntarily. He testified that in addition to the legal penalties for draft evasion, he was afraid of the violent reputation of the Japanese secret police and had been told that the US consulate would not have assisted him if he had sought help to avoid conscription. After Pearl Harbor, when he said to other Japanese soldiers that Japan could not win the war, he was regularly beaten every day for a month. The government called no evidence of its own. Nevertheless the district judge disbelieved him and confirmed his loss of citizenship. The decision was upheld by the Court of Appeals for the Ninth Circuit. Nishikawa appealed to the Supreme Court.

Decision 
The Supreme Court overturned the decisions of the courts below, holding that the Government bears the burden of proving not only that a citizen has enlisted in a foreign state but also that his enlistment was voluntary.

Precedents and argument 
The court followed the decision of Mandoli v. Acheson, 344 U.S. 133 in which it had held that "it is settled that no conduct results in expatriation unless the conduct is engaged in voluntarily," a position not challenged by the State Department in argument. The court also followed Gonzales v. Landon, 350 U.S. 920, where the court had held that the burden of proof in cases of denaturalization under section 401(j) was on the Government "by clear, convincing and unequivocal evidence." The court extended this rule to cases under all subsections of section 401. In Schneiderman v. United States, 320 U.S. 118, the court had held that in a case concerning "the precious right of citizenship ... we believe the facts and the law should be construed as far as is reasonably possible in favor of the citizen."

The State Department argued that the normal burden of proving duress is on the party relying on it. Nishikawa argued that voluntariness was an intrinsic element of the conduct required by section 401.

Majority opinion 
Chief Justice Warren delivered the opinion of the court:

The court then examined the evidence on the district court record and found that there was insufficient evidence for the district judge's finding against Nishikawa: "Nor can the district judge's disbelief of petitioner's story of his motives and fears fill the evidentiary gap in the Government's case. The Government's only affirmative evidence was that petitioner went to Japan at a time when he was subject to conscription." The Court therefore remanded the case to the district court for issuance of a declaration that Nishikawa remained a US citizen.

Dissenting opinion 
Justice Harlan (joined by Justice Clark) dissented, arguing that "To permit conscription without more to establish duress unjustifiably limits, if it does not largely nullify, the mandate of § 401(c)," since by 1940 conscription had become the main way of raising armies around the world. He also believed that the burden of proving duress should remain on Nishikawa: "One of the prime reasons for imposing the burden of proof on the party claiming involuntariness is that the evidence normally lies in his possession." He therefore thought that the Supreme Court should defer to the district judge's findings on Nishikawa's credibility.

See also 
 Kennedy v. Mendoza-Martinez
 Perez v. Brownell
 Afroyim v. Rusk

References

Further reading

External links 

 Interview with lawyer Fred Okrand about the historical context: "Forty years defending the Constitution oral history transcript." Fred Okrand. (1982 University of California, LA.)

1958 in United States case law
United States Supreme Court cases
United States Supreme Court cases of the Warren Court
United States immigration and naturalization case law
Denaturalization case law